Sidhmukh is a town and  the tehsil headquarters in the Churu district of Rajasthan, India.

References

Cities and towns in Churu district